The 1922 Giro d'Italia was the tenth edition of the Giro d'Italia, a Grand Tour organized and sponsored by the newspaper La Gazzetta dello Sport. The race was won by the Italian rider Giovanni Brunero of the Legnano team. Second and third respectively were the Italian riders Bartolomeo Aymo and Giuseppe Enrici.

Participants

Of the 75 riders that began the Giro d'Italia on 24 May, fifteen of them made it to the finish in Milan on 11 June. Riders were allowed to ride on their own or as a member of a team. There were four teams that competed in the race: Bianchi-Salga, Ganna-Dunlop, Legnano-Pirelli, and Maino-Bergougnan.

The peloton was almost completely composed of Italians. The field featured one former Giro d'Italia champion in the 1919 Giro d'Italia winner Costante Girardengo. Other notable Italian riders that started the race included Giovanni Brunero, Bartolomeo Aymo, and Gaetano Belloni.

Final standings

Stage results

General classification

There were fifteen cyclists who had completed all ten stages. For these cyclists, the times they had needed in each stage was added up for the general classification. The cyclist with the least accumulated time was the winner.

Other classifications

There were two other classifications contested at the race. A juniors classification was won Giuseppe Enrici and the isolati classification was won by Domenico Schierano. Each of these classifications were calculated like the general classification.

References

Notes

Citations

1922
Giro d'Italia
Giro d'Italia
Giro d'Italia
Giro d'Italia